Sarah El Haïry (born 16 March 1989) is a French politician of the Democratic Movement (MoDem) who has been serving as State Secretary for Youth at the Ministry of National Education in the governments of Prime Ministers Jean Castex from (2020–2022) and Élisabeth Borne (since 2022). She was previously a member of the French National Assembly from 2017 until 2020, representing the department of Loire-Atlantique.

Early life and education
Born to Franco-Moroccan parents, El Haïry attended school in Metz and graduated from Lycée Lyautey high school in Casablanca in Morocco.

El Haïry studied law in Nantes and stayed in Canada before becoming a trader in a cooperative.

Political career
Initially active within the Union for a Popular Movement (UMP), El Haïry eventually joined Democratic Movement (MoDem) in 2014.

In parliament, El Haïry served as member of the Finance Committee from 2017 until 2020 and on the Committee on Legal Affairs from 2018 until 2019. In this capacity, she was the parliament's rapporteur on a 2018 bill aimed at improving the financial situation of associations and authored a 2019 report on philanthropy in France. In addition to her committee assignments, she was part of the French-Cypriot Parliamentary Friendship Group.

Since February 2018, El Haïry has been serving as MoDem's spokesperson, alongside Jean-Noël Barrot.

In July 2020, El Haïry was appointed Secretary of State for the Youth to the Minister of National Education, Youth and Sports Jean-Michel Blanquer.

Political positions
El Haïry opposed the Aéroport du Grand Ouest project.

References

1989 births
Living people
Deputies of the 15th National Assembly of the French Fifth Republic
Women members of the National Assembly (France)
Democratic Movement (France) politicians
21st-century French women politicians
University of Nantes alumni
French people of Moroccan descent
Politicians from Centre-Val de Loire
Secretaries of State of France
Deputies of the 16th National Assembly of the French Fifth Republic
Members of the Borne government
Members of Parliament for Loire-Atlantique